Khosrow Basheh-ye Madeh Zaran (also Romanized as Khosrow Bāsheh-ye Mādeh Zārān; also known as Khosrow Bāsheh, Māveh Zārān, and Posht Gelah) is a village in Zamkan Rural District, in the Central District of Salas-e Babajani County, Kermanshah Province, Iran. At the 2006 census, its population was 112, in 26 families.

References 

Populated places in Salas-e Babajani County